General elections were held in Saint Vincent and the Grenadines on 16 May 1989. The result was a  landslide victory for the centrist New Democratic Party, which won all fifteen seats, returning James Mitchell to a second term as Prime Minister. Voter turnout was 72.4%.

The 1989 election is also the most lopsided in terms of the popular vote margin since the country gained independence in 1979, with the NDP securing a 36-point victory over the second-placed Saint Vincent Labour Party. As of 2017, this is the last time that a single party won over 60% of the popular vote or more than 80% of the constituencies. It is also the last time that North Central Windward, South Windward, and Central Leeward have voted for the NDP.

Results

References

Saint Vincent
Elections in Saint Vincent and the Grenadines
1989 in Saint Vincent and the Grenadines